The 2013 UCI Mountain Bike & Trials World Championships was the 24th edition of the UCI Mountain Bike & Trials World Championships, and was held in Pietermaritzburg, South Africa (Trials, Downhill, Cross-country Eliminator, and Olympic Cross-country events) and Leogang, Austria (Four-cross events).

Medal summary

Men's events

Women's events

Team events

Medal table

See also
2013 UCI Mountain Bike World Cup

References

External links

UCI Mountain Bike World Championships
UCI Mountain Bike World Championships
International sports competitions hosted by South Africa
UCI Mountain Bike World Championships
Sport in KwaZulu-Natal
Mountain biking events in South Africa